Tubbreva is a genus of minute sea snails, marine gastropod mollusks in the family Cingulopsidae.

Species
 Tubbreva exaltata 
 Tubbreva exigua 
 Tubbreva insignificans 
 Tubbreva micrometrica 
 Tubbreva minutula 
 Tubbreva parva

References

Cingulopsidae
Taxa named by Arthur William Baden Powell